50 may refer to: 
 50 (number)
 one of the following years 50 BC, AD 50, 1950, 2050
.50 BMG, a heavy machine gun cartridge also used in sniper rifles
.50 Action Express, a large pistol cartridge commonly used in the Desert Eagle
.50 GI, a wildcat pistol cartridge
.50 Beowulf, a powerful rifle cartridge used in the AR-15 platform
.50 Alaskan, a wildcat rifle cartridge
50 Cent, an American rapper
Labatt 50, a Canadian beer
Fifty (film), a 2015 film
"The Fifty", a group of fifty airmen murdered by the Gestapo after The Great Escape in World War II
50 (album), a 2016 album by singer Rick Astley
Benjamin Yeaten, widely known by his radio call sign "50", a Liberian military and mercenary leader
"Fifty", a song by Karma to Burn from the album V, 2011

See also
 5O (disambiguation)